Milošević is a patronymic surname derived from the given name Miloš. It is predominantly worn by ethnic Serbs, and to a lesser degree Montenegrins and Croats.

Milošević is the tenth most frequent surname in Serbia.

Notable people with the surname include:
Alexander Milošević, Swedish footballer
Boki Milošević, Serbian clarinetist
Deni Milošević, Bosnian footballer
Dragomir Milošević, Bosnian Serb paramilitary leader
Dušan Milošević, Serbian footballer
Danny Milosevic, Australian footballer
Goran Milošević, Serbian footballer
Ivan Milošević (born 1984), Serbian footballer
Jovana Milosevic (born 1982), Australian handball player
Katrina Milosevic (born 1976), Australian Actor
Milenko Milošević, Bosnian-Serb footballer

Miljan Milošević, Montenegrin actor
Miloš Milošević, Croatian swimmer of Serbian descent

Savo Milošević, Serbian footballer, ex-captain of nation team
Selena Milošević, Croatian handball player
Slađana Milošević, Serbian singer-songwriter, composer, record producer and writer
Slobodan Milošević (1941–2006), Serbian politician, President of FR Yugoslavia
Sofija Milošević, Serbian fashion model
Tamara Milosevic, German documentary filmmaker of Serbian descent
Vlado Milošević, Bosnian-Serb composer

See also
Milović

References

Serbian surnames
Croatian surnames
Patronymic surnames
Surnames from given names